BAY 60–6583 is a selective adenosine A2B receptor agonist. It has been shown to provide protection from ischemia (lack of oxygen due to blocked blood supply) in both the heart and kidney of test animals, and has also been shown to be beneficial in treatment of acute lung and brain injury, as well as claimed anti-aging and anti-obesity effects, showing a range of potential applications for selective A2B agonists.

References 

4-Hydroxybiphenyl ethers
Aromatic nitriles
Acetamides
Adenosine receptor agonists
Aminopyridines
Cyclopropanes
Thioethers